A list of films produced by the Israeli film industry in 1987.

1987 releases

Unknown premiere date

Awards

See also
1987 in Israel

References

External links
 Israeli films of 1987 at the Internet Movie Database

Israeli
Film
1987